AirAttack 2 (also known as AirAttack 2 - WW2 Airplanes Shooter) is a 2015 action arcade video game developed by Art In Games for iOS and Android. It is a sequel to the 2010 game AirAttack.

Gameplay
Set in World War II, AirAttack 2 is played from third person perspective with warplanes of F4U Corsair, Spitfire, Yak-1, P-40 Tigershark, P-38 Lightning and the recently added P-51 Mustang. Recently a special Spitfire, P-38 lighting, Yak-3, P-40 Tigershark and P-51 Mustang was added to the game that use superweapons as primary weapon. Player must destroy and vanish some building structures, factories, vehicles, military vehicles,  some gigantic boss vehicles, marine ships and copters in order to proceed the next levels. It consists of 22 missions. Reviewers praised the three dimensional environment and graphics, and additional weapons, such as tail gunner, and missiles. The airplane unlike its predecessor, can access gadgets in any time once equipped and have ability to enter in building. In the game, there is daily challenges to a friend on survival mode.

As in the original game, each player must choose a type of warplane to start a game. Each type has specific weapons: Spitfire uses flamethrower, Yak emits rope-like frozen laser, P40-Tigershark emits cyclonic winds and P38-Lightnings have electrically charged laser and the P-51 Mustang emits four green swirling beams . The game is set in World War II based on the destruction of Nazi planes. The survival mode allows player versus player challenge via multiplayer. As player accomplish missions, silver ingots and silver stars are awarded. Silver ingots are also granted in certain achievements and rank awards. Shops are useful if player wishes to upgrade the planes and arsenals. The game unlike its prequel, has special features that protect planes from enemy attacks; such as tail gunner and missiles, which can be equipped once when entering the game.

References 

2015 video games
Video games developed in Slovakia
Action video games
Android (operating system) games
IOS games
Shoot 'em ups
World War II video games